Coleotechnites chillcotti is a moth of the family Gelechiidae. It is found in North America, where it has been recorded from Alabama, Louisiana, Maryland, New Jersey, Pennsylvania and South Carolina.

The larvae feed on the needles of Pinus palustris.

References

Moths described in 1963
Coleotechnites